Silver City is a Census Designated Place and small residential community in Lyon County, Nevada, USA, near the Lyon/Carson border. The population as of the 2000 census was 170.

History

Silver City was established in 1859, named for the silver deposits discovered in the area near the Lyon/Carson border. Through this narrow gorge called Gold Canyon, above the historic Devil's Gate rock formation, thousands of travelers passed on their way to the silver mines of the Comstock Lode.

By 1861, the town had four hotels, multiple saloons and boarding houses, and a population of 1,200. Silver city provided boarding facilities for animals used in hauling ore-laden wagons between the Comstock mining areas and mills on the Carson River. A foundry, the first iron works in Nevada was moved here from Johntown in 1862. The town was the site of the Comstock's first silver mill—Paul's Pioneer. During the 1870s, additional mills were built and by 1871, Silver City had eight mills with 95 stamps.

The population began to decline after the Virginia and Truckee Railroad was completed in 1869. Construction workers left the area, taking their business with them.

Geography

Climate
Silver City experiences a warm summer Mediterranean climate (Csb).

Demographics

See also
 List of ghost towns in Nevada

References

1859 establishments in Utah Territory
Mining communities in Nevada
Unincorporated communities in Lyon County, Nevada
Unincorporated communities in Nevada